Horacio Daniel Rosatti (born 11 August 1956) is an Argentine lawyer, politician and a member of the Supreme Court of Argentina since 2016, designated by president Mauricio Macri's and the Senate's approval. On September of 2021 he was elected President of the court by his peers, and took office on October 1st 

Rosatti graduated in law from the National University of the Littoral. He is also a Doctor in History by the Pontifical Catholic University of Argentina

As politician, for the Justicialist Party, he served as Mayor of Santa Fe from 1995 to 1999, as Procurator of the Treasury of the Nation from 2003 to 2004, and then as Minister of Justice when the president Néstor Kirchner appointed him to the position between 2004 and 2005.

References 

1956 births
Living people
20th-century Argentine lawyers
Supreme Court of Argentina justices
National University of the Littoral alumni
Argentine people of Italian descent
Mayors of Santa Fe, Argentina
21st-century Argentine judges